The Essential Cheap Trick is the fourth compilation album by Cheap Trick and part of Sony BMG's The Essential series. It contains at least one song from every album up to Special One (including Silver), except the commercial failure The Doctor. A reissue in 2010, retitled "The Essential Cheap Trick: Limited Edition 3.0", added a third disc with seven additional songs.

Track listing

Disc 1
All songs written by Rick Nielsen except as noted.

Disc 2

Disc 3 (Limited Edition 3.0 only)

Personnel 
 Robin Zander – lead vocals, rhythm guitar
 Rick Nielsen – lead guitar, keyboards, backing vocals
 Tom Petersson – bass, backing vocals
 Bun E. Carlos – drums
 Jon Brant – bass, backing vocals
 Mark Radice – keyboards, backing vocals

References

Cheap Trick compilation albums
2004 greatest hits albums
Albums produced by Jack Douglas (record producer)
Albums produced by Tom Werman
Albums produced by George Martin
Albums produced by Roy Thomas Baker
Albums produced by Todd Rundgren
Albums produced by Richie Zito
Albums produced by Ted Templeman
Epic Records compilation albums